Santou  (locally, Santu) is a town and sub-prefecture in the Télimélé Prefecture in the Kindia Region of western-central Guinea.

Mining 
 Bauxite and iron ore are mined in this district.

Transport 

A standard gauge railway is under construction to connect these mines with the new port of Dapilon.

References 

Sub-prefectures of the Kindia Region